Alexander Paul Mitchell (born 7 October 2001) is an English professional footballer who plays as a defender for St Johnstone, on loan from Millwall.

Career
Mitchell began his career with Millwall in 2018, the same year he was voted the club's Academy Schoolboy of the Year, before spending time on loan at non-league Bromley, before signing a new long-term contract with Millwall in August 2021. Later that month he moved on loan to Leyton Orient.

In July 2022 he moved on loan to Scottish club St Johnstone.

Career statistics

References

2001 births
Living people
English footballers
Millwall F.C. players
Bromley F.C. players
Leyton Orient F.C. players
St Johnstone F.C. players
National League (English football) players
English Football League players
Scottish Professional Football League players
Association football defenders